This list of tunnels in Switzerland includes all notable road, rail, waterway, or other tunnels in Switzerland.

See also
List of tunnels by location
List of tunnels in the Alps
List of tunnels in Austria

References

External links 
 Swiss Tunnelling Society, Swiss Tunnel Database

Switzerland
Tunnels
 
Tunnels